Dasypogon is a   genus of flowering plants in the family Dasypogonaceae.  It includes three species, all endemic to Western Australia.

References

External links

Dasypogonaceae
Commelinid genera
Endemic flora of Western Australia